Cassius Longinus may refer to:

In descending chronological order: 
 Cassius Longinus, end of 2nd century, beginning of 3rd century, historian only known through FGrHist 259.
 Cassius Longinus (philosopher) (213 – 273 AD), a Greek rhetorician and philosopher
 Gaius Cassius Longinus (consul 30) (fl. 30–41 AD), a Roman jurist and great grandson or nephew of Gaius Cassius Longinus, who committed tyrannicide
 Longinus, also called Cassius in some traditions, a name in Christian tradition for the Roman soldier who allegedly pierced the side of Jesus on the cross
 Gaius Cassius Longinus (c. 86- 42 BC), usually known as Cassius, a Roman senator and one of Julius Caesar's assassins in 44 BC
 Quintus Cassius Longinus, a tribune in 49 BC and supporter of Julius Caesar
 Lucius Cassius Longinus (praetor 66 BC), and part of the Second Catilinarian conspiracy
 Gaius Cassius Longinus (consul 73 BC)
 Gaius Cassius Longinus (consul 96 BC)
 Lucius Cassius Longinus (consul 107 BC)
 Gaius Cassius Longinus (consul 124 BC)
 Lucius Cassius Longinus Ravilla, consul 127 BC
 Gaius Cassius Longinus (consul 171 BC)

See also 
 Cassia gens
 Longinus (disambiguation)
 Casca Rufio Longinus, a character from Casca (series), based on Saint Longinus
 Cassius (disambiguation)